Doublet Pool is a hot spring in the Upper Geyser Basin of Yellowstone National Park, Wyoming.

Its scalloped edge is made of geyserite. Eruptions can occur in Doublet Pool, but only last up to 8 minutes. The pool on the right pulses over the vents about every two hours. Occasionally there will be vibrations, surface wave motion, and thumping; these effects are caused by collapsing gas and steam bubbles deep underground.

See also
List of Yellowstone geothermal features
Yellowstone National Park
Geothermal areas of Yellowstone

References

Geysers of Wyoming
Geothermal features of Teton County, Wyoming
Geothermal features of Yellowstone National Park
Geysers of Teton County, Wyoming